Vladimir Viktorovich Smirnov (20 May 1954 – 28 July 1982) was a Soviet foil fencer.

Biography
Smirnov won the gold medal in individual men's foil at the 1980 Summer Olympics. He won the World Championships the following year.

During the 1982 World Championships in Rome, Smirnov was fencing Matthias Behr of West Germany on 19 July.  Behr's blade broke during the action, and the broken blade went through the mesh of Smirnov's mask, through his eye orbit, and into his brain.  Smirnov died nine days later.

Smirnov's accident was the driving force behind the significant improvement of safety gear in fencing.  Maraging steel blades (instead of the carbon steel ones of the day), kevlar (or other ballistic nylon) in the uniforms, and masks two to three times stronger than the one he wore, and other safety rules, all came about because of his death.

References

1954 births
1982 deaths
People from Rubizhne
Fencers at the 1980 Summer Olympics
Olympic fencers of the Soviet Union
Olympic gold medalists for the Soviet Union
Olympic silver medalists for the Soviet Union
Olympic bronze medalists for the Soviet Union
Sport deaths in Italy
Soviet male épée fencers
Ukrainian male épée fencers
Ukrainian foil fencers
Olympic medalists in fencing
Medalists at the 1980 Summer Olympics
Universiade medalists in fencing
Universiade silver medalists for the Soviet Union
Soviet male foil fencers
Sportspeople from Luhansk Oblast